Wrestling was one of the sports which was held at the 1982 Asian Games in New Delhi, India, between 28 November and 2 December 1982. The competition included only men's freestyle events.

Medalists

Medal table

References

External links
UWW Database

 
1982 Asian Games events
1982
Asian Games
1982 Asian Games